John Eubanks is an American and Canadian football player.

John Eubanks may also refer to:

John Hugh Eubanks, known as J. J. Eubanks, professional basketball player

See also
John Eubank, baseball pitcher